Rhotekin 2 is a protein in humans that is encoded by the RTKN2 gene.

References

Further reading 

Genes on human chromosome 10